Ville Nikkari (born 5 November 1988) is a Finnish former professional footballer.

References
Guardian Football

1988 births
Living people
Finnish footballers
FC Inter Turku players
Veikkausliiga players
Association football defenders
Footballers from Turku